William T. Lackey (1896–1974) was an American film producer. He worked with Monogram Pictures for a number of years.

Filmography

 Fast and Fearless (1924)
 Hard-Hittin' Hamilton (1924)
 Bringin' Home the Bacon (1924)
 Thundering Romance (1924)
 Defend Yourself (1925)
 Pursued (1925)
 Full Speed (1925)
 Frenzied Flames (1926)
 Forest Havoc (1926)
 The Pay-Off (1926)
 Race Wild (1926)
 Lightning Reporter (1926)
 Speeding Through (1926)
 The Warning Signal (1926)
 Fire and Steel (1927)
Burning Gold (1927)
 Duty's Reward (1927)
 Riding to Fame (1927)
 Roaring Fires (1927)
 Hazardous Valley (1927)
 An Oklahoma Cowboy (1929)
 Guilty or Not Guilty (1932)
 Klondike (1932)
 Self Defense (1932)
 Skyway (1933)
 He Couldn't Take It (1933)
 The Phantom Broadcast (1933)
 The Sweetheart of Sigma Chi (1933)
 A Woman's Man (1934)
 The Loudspeaker (1934)
 City Limits (1934)
 Beggars in Ermine (1934)
 Girl o' My Dreams (1934)
 Lost in the Stratosphere (1934)
 Shock (1934)
 A Girl of the Limberlost (1934)
 The Nut Farm (1935)
 The Keeper of the Bees (1935)
 Wanderer of the Wasteland (1935)
 Nevada (1935)
 And Sudden Death (1936)
 Drift Fence (1936)
 Forgotten Faces (1936)
 Desert Gold (1936)
 Murder Goes to College (1937)
 Born to the West (1937)
 Under the Big Top (1938)
 Gangster's Boy (1938)
 Mr. Wong in Chinatown (1939)
 Mr. Wong, Detective (1939)
 Navy Secrets (1939)
 Streets of New York (1939)
 The Mystery of Mr. Wong (1939)
 Tomboy (1940)
 Haunted House (1940)
 The Fatal Hour (1940)
 Father Steps Out (1941)
 Here Comes Kelly (1943)
 The Lucky Stiff (1949)
 Destination Big House (1950)
 Pride of Maryland (1951)
 Street Bandits (1951)
 Insurance Investigator (1951)
 Secrets of Monte Carlo (1951)

References

Bibliography
 Goble, Alan. The Complete Index to Literary Sources in Film. Walter de Gruyter, 1999.

External links

1896 births
1974 deaths
American film producers
People from Saugerties, New York